Oleg Vladimirovich Besov (born 1933) is a Russian mathematician. He heads the Department of Function Theory at the Steklov Institute of Mathematics, where he defended his PhD in 1960 and habilitation in 1966. He was an Invited Speaker at the ICM in 1970 in Nice. He is professor at the Moscow Institute of Physics and Technology and a member of the Russian Academy of Sciences (since 1990) and European Academy of Sciences (since 2002). A festschrift was published in honor of Besov's 70th birthday.

See also
Besov space

Selected publications
with Valentin Petrovich Ilʹin and Sergeĭ Mikhaĭlovich Nikolʹskiĭ: Integral representations of functions and imbedding theorems. Vol. 1. V. H. Winston & Sons, 1978. Vol. 2, 1979.

References

1933 births
Living people
Russian mathematicians
Academic staff of the Moscow Institute of Physics and Technology